EcoBoost is a series of turbocharged, direct-injection gasoline engines produced by Ford and originally co-developed by FEV Inc. (now FEV North America Inc.). EcoBoost engines are designed to deliver power and torque consistent with those of larger-displacement (cylinder volume) naturally aspirated engines, while achieving about 30% better fuel efficiency and 15% fewer greenhouse emissions, according to Ford. The manufacturer sees the EcoBoost technology as less costly and more versatile than further developing or expanding the use of hybrid and diesel engine technologies. EcoBoost engines are broadly available across the Ford vehicle lineup.

Global production
EcoBoost gasoline direct-injection turbocharged engine technology adds 128 patents and patent applications to Ford's 4,618 active and thousands of pending US patents. Some of the costs of US development and production were assisted by the $5.9 billion Advanced Technology Vehicles Manufacturing Loan Program of the Department of Energy.

The V6 EcoBoost engines are being assembled at Cleveland Engine Plant No. 1 in Brook Park, Ohio. The 2.0-liter I4 EcoBoost engines were produced at the Ford Valencia Plant in Spain in 2009. The 1.6-liter I4 EcoBoost engines are assembled at the Ford Bridgend Engine Plant in the United Kingdom. The smaller 1000cc-displacement 3 cylinder EcoBoost engine is produced both at Ford Germany in Cologne and at Ford Romania in Craiova.

By 2012, the company planned to produce 750,000 EcoBoost units annually in the US and 1.3 million globally in the world market. Ford expected over 90% of its global vehicle lineup (includes North America) to offer EcoBoost engine technology by 2013. From the engine's beginning to November 2012, 500,000 Ford EcoBoost vehicles have been sold.

During Ford's ownership of Volvo (until 2010), it used the term PTDi (petrol turbocharged direct injection) for the 1.6 L I4 engine when introducing Volvo S60 concept and for the 2.0 L I4 engine when introducing Volvo XC60.

Safety issues
Ford has had to refund hundreds of customers worldwide because Ford EcoBoost engines in their vehicles have overheated and, in some cases, caused engine fires. In 2015, a South African man died after becoming trapped in his Ford Kuga after its 1.6-litre EcoBoost engine burst into flames. In 2017, Ford South Africa recalled all Kugas in the country for engine checks.

Engine family list

Inline three-cylinder

1.0 L Fox

Ford produces a 1.0 L turbocharged in-line three-cylinder engine for the EcoBoost family developed at Ford's Dunton Technical Centre in the UK. Production started in April 2012.

The engine block is cast iron, which offers, in addition to the required strength, up to 50% faster warm-up than aluminum, at the expense of additional weight.

To quell the natural vibrations of a three-cylinder design, unspecified efforts have been made in the flywheel design to ensure satisfactorily smooth running without the use of energy sapping balance shafts. The 1.0L EcoBoost GTDI engine uses an oil-bathed timing belt.

The engine is packaged in an engine block with a footprint the size of an A4 sheet of paper. With the introduction of the face-lifted 2013 Ford Fiesta, Ford introduced a naturally aspirated version of 1.0 Fox engine. The two versions produce 65 hp and 80 hp, and both engines use direct injection and Ti-VCT like the turbocharged versions. Start-stop technology is also available.

The engines are produced in Cologne (Germany), Craiova (Romania) and Chongqing (China). Production is expected to be 700,000–1,500,000 units per year.

The 1.0 L EcoBoost engine was introduced to the American market with the 2014 Ford Fiesta sedan and hatchback, although cars with this engine did not sell particularly well. It was announced at the 2012 Los Angeles Auto Show, when the Fiesta was introduced.  The 123-hp version debuted in the North American market Focus in the 2015 model year. The engine accounted for less than 5 percent of Fiesta and Focus sales in the U.S., according to a 2017 report. The 1.0 L engine was awarded the International Engine of Year Award 2016, making it the Best Engine Under 1.0 L for the fifth time in a row. After the discontinuation of the Focus and Fiesta in North America, the 1.0 L is only available there in the EcoSport.

In 2017 Ford was again awarded International Engine of Year (for Engines Under 1.0 L) with a largely reconfigured version of the Ecoboost 1.0. Although thermodynamically similar to the old Ecoboost 1.0, the new engine features cylinder deactivation under low-load conditions. A new dual-mass flywheel and a vibration-damping clutch disc (in manual-transmission vehicles) help neutralise engine oscillations when running on two cylinders. Production started in 2018.

In 2019, Ford launched an mHEV version of the 1.0 EcoBoost engine first fitted to the Puma SUV, which uses a belt-driven integrated starter/generator-motor (BiSG); which is in essence a starter motor, alternator, and propulsion motor in one. Fundamentally, the engine is identical to the 2018–present 1.0 EcoBoost, but features the electric starter/generator and its battery system. The motor itself is not used to propel the vehicle on its own, and is mainly used to increase efficiency by reducing engine load, provide extra power during acceleration, and to reduce the perceived ‘turbo-lag’ at certain engine speeds while accelerating. The starter/generator makes use of a 48-volt battery system in the car, although vehicles fitted with these engines are not plug-in hybrids or full hybrids. Further developments introduced include a more comprehensive ‘start-stop’ functionality, which was previously available but did not cut the engine off until the vehicle was completely stopped. The new engines can turn off while the car decelerates, at a maximum speed of about 15 mph. The new, electrified engines are available with a manual- or Ford's new seven-speed dual-clutch PowerShift automatic transmission, and are available in either 125 bhp or 154 bhp outputs.

Applications

 2018–2019 Ford Focus 

 2012–present Ford Focus
 2012–present Ford C-Max
 2012–present Ford B-Max
 2013–present Ford Fiesta
 2013–present Ford Ecosport

 2012–present Ford Focus
 2012–present Ford C-Max
 2012–present Ford B-Max
 2013–present Ford Fiesta
 2013–present Ford EcoSport
 2013–present Ford Mondeo
 2014–present Ford Transit Courier

 2014–present Ford Fiesta
 2014–2018 Ford Focus
 (EcoBoost Hybrid (MHEV)) & 125 PS (92 kW; 123 hp) (EcoBoost Hybrid (MHEV))
 2019–present Ford Puma mHEV
 2020–present Ford Fiesta mHEV
 2020–present Ford Focus mHEV

Motorsports
 Ford Fiesta Rally4
 Ford Fiesta Rally5

1.1 L Duratec Ti-VCT

Applications

 2017–present Ford Fiesta 1.1 Ti-VCT (70)

 2017–present Ford Fiesta 1.1 Ti-VCT (85)

1.5 L Dragon 
On 24 February 2017, as part of the unveiling of the seventh generation (Mk8 - UK) derived Fiesta ST, Ford announced an all-new aluminum inline 3-cylinder 1.5 L EcoBoost engine with cylinder deactivation technology. The version of this engine announced for the Fiesta ST produces  at 6,000 rpm and delivers  of torque from 1,600 to 4,000 rpm.

The engine is based on an expansion of the 1.0 EcoBoost, taking the capacity per cylinder up to 500cc which Ford consider is likely to be the maximum for optimum thermal efficiency. The engine is an all-aluminum design with integrated exhaust manifold, low inertia mixed flow turbocharger and combines both port fuel injection and direct fuel injection.

The engine will be available with cylinder deactivation technology, implemented by stopping fuel delivery and valve operation for one of the engine's cylinders in conditions where full capacity is not needed.

Applications

 2018–present Ford Focus

 2018–present Ford Focus
 2020–present Ford Escape
 2021 - Ford Bronco Sport (181 hp)

 2018–present Ford Fiesta ST
2021–present Ford Puma ST

Motorsports
 Ford Fiesta Rally3

Inline four-cylinder
Four versions of EcoBoost I4 engines are in production. A 1.5 L downsized version of the 1.6 L, the 1.6 L which replaces larger-displacement, naturally aspirated I4 engines in Ford vehicles, a 2.0 L which replaces small-displacement, naturally aspirated V6 engines, and a 2.3 L used in high-performance applications. All four engines are turbocharged and direct injected. The production engine family was officially announced at the 2009 Frankfurt Motor Show.

1.5 L 
A 1.5 L version of the EcoBoost engine family was first unveiled in the 2014 Ford Fusion as a downsized version of the 1.6 L EcoBoost engine. The downsized displacement is a result of Chinese vehicle tax regulations which tax vehicles with engine displacements of 1.5 L or less at lower rates. The 1.5 L EcoBoost adds new technology compared to the 1.6 L on which it is based, including an integrated exhaust manifold and a computer-controlled water pump clutch to decrease warm up time. In the 2015 Fusion, the engine produces  and 185 lb ft .

Applications

 2014 - 2020 Ford Fusion
 2015 - Ford Focus

 2017–2019 Ford Escape

 2017–2019 Landwind X7

 2015 - Ford Mondeo

 2015 - Ford Focus
 2015 - Ford C-Max

1.6 L 

The 1.6-litre version was first unveiled in the 2009 Lincoln C concept. This was also installed in many Volvos during the years of Ford's ownership of that company; Volvo badged the engine B4164T# (with # being different number for different iterations).

The European market version of the 1.6 L provides , although a  version is used in the Ford Mondeo.

The 1.6 L EcoBoost engine is raced in the British Formula Ford Championship. The units have replaced the original N/A 1.6 L Duratec units, which in turn replaced the 1.8 L Zetec-engined cars. The engine has also been used for the past few seasons in the WRC in the Ford Fiesta.

The 1.6 L EcoBoost engine is also produced at the Ford Bridgend Engine Plant in Bridgend, Wales.

Safety and recalls

In 2013, Ford has recalled certain Ford Escapes equipped with this engine due to the potential for them to catch fire after overheating.

In 2017, Ford recalled over 360,000 Ford Escape, Ford Fiesta ST, Ford Fusion, Ford Transit Connect, Ford Focus and C-Max hybrid  with 1.6 ecoboost engines because of a risk of engine fires caused by a "lack of coolant circulation". There were 29 fires in the U.S. and Canada reported to Ford. The recall partly contributed to a charge of US$300 million by Ford.

Specifications
Type-turbocharged, direct gasoline-injected inline four-cylinder engine with twin independent variable-camshaft timing
Displacement-1,596 cc (1.6 L; 97 cu in)

Applications

 2013— Volvo V40

 2010— Ford C-MAX
 2010— Ford Focus
 2010—2018 Volvo S60
 2010—2018 Volvo V60
 2012— Volvo V40

 2011— Ford Mondeo
 2011— Ford S-Max
 2011— Ford Galaxy

 2010 — Ford Focus
 2013—2016 Ford Escape
 2014—2016 Ford Transit Connect
 2010—2018 Volvo S60 DRIVe FFV (Thailand)

 2010— Ford C-MAX
 2010—2018 Volvo S60
 2010—2018 Volvo V60
 2011— Ford Focus
 2011—2016 Volvo V70
 2011—2016 Volvo S80
 2012— Volvo V40
 2013— Ford Fiesta ST (all)
 2013−2014 Ford Fusion

 2016—2017 Ford Fiesta ST200

Motorsports
 Ford Fiesta R5
 Ford Fiesta Rally2
 Ford Fiesta RS WRC
 Ford Fiesta WRC
 Ford Puma Rally1

2.0 L (2010–2015)

A 2.0 L version was first seen in the 2008 Ford Explorer America concept.

It is the first EcoBoost engine to include twin independent variable cam timing (Ti-VCT), with advertised 10–20% better fuel economy while maintaining the performance of 3.0 L V6s.

This engine is derived from the 2.0 L Mazda L engine block used by Ford in the North American Focus MK3, but equipped with unique heads, fuel injection system, and Ford's Ti-VCT. It should not be confused with the Mazda 2.3 DISI Turbo, which also features direct injection along with turbocharging, but shares little else aside from the same engine block.

The 2.0 L EcoBoost engine used in North American vehicles is now produced at the Cleveland Engine Plant in Brook Park, Ohio.

Specifications
Type- turbocharged, direct gasoline-injected inline four-cylinder engine with Ti-VCT
Displacement-

Applications
Although not listed some 2.0 EcoBoost engines have a different block design including alternate weaker deck design and cooling ports missing. When installed in Volvos, these engines are called B4204T6 and T7.

It should also be noted that North American-spec and European-spec engines have different cylinder heads: North American market vehicles use a cylinder head with an integrated exhaust manifold, while European-spec vehicles use a cylinder head with individual exhaust ports and a conventional exhaust manifold.
  at 6500 rpm,   at 4450 rpm
 2012–2014 Ford Focus
  at 5500 rpm,   at 1750-4500 rpm
 2010– Ford S-MAX
 2010– Ford Galaxy
 2010– Ford Mondeo
 2010–2011 Volvo S60 2.0T
 2010–2011 Volvo V60 2.0T
 2010–2011 Volvo V70 2.0T
  at 5500 rpm,  at 1900–3500 rpm (Note: Torque figures are not uniform for all of the following vehicles)
 2010– Ford Mondeo
2010–2013 Volvo S60 T5
2010–2013 Volvo V60 T5
2012–2017 Volvo XC60 T5
 2011–2015 Ford Explorer
 2011–2014 Ford Edge
 2011– 2017 Range Rover Evoque
 2011– Ford S-MAX
 2012–2016 Ford Falcon
 2013–2015 Ford Escape / Ford Kuga
 2013–2015 Land Rover Freelander 2
 2013–2016 Ford Fusion
 2013–2017 Ford Taurus
 2013–2015 Lincoln MKZ
 2015–2017 Land Rover Discovery Sport
 2015-2017 Jaguar XE 25T
 2015–2018 Lincoln MKC
  at 5500 rpm,  at 2000–4500 rpm
 2012–2018 Ford Focus ST
  at 5500 rpm,  at 1900–3500
 2008–2017 VUHL 05
  at 5500 rpm, 270 lb⋅ft (366 N·m) at 2500 rpm, Ford-RPE (Radical Performance Engines)
 2011– Radical SR3 SL

2.0 L "Twin-scroll" (2015–) 

A redesigned 2.0 L EcoBoost four-cylinder was introduced with the second-generation Ford Edge, followed by the 2017 Ford Escape in spring 2016. It features a higher compression ratio than its predecessor (10.1:1 vs 9.3:1) along with twin-scroll turbocharger and fuel and oil systems upgrades. This new engine will deliver more low-end torque than its predecessor and all-wheel drive will be available in this configuration. It is also expected to tow  in the redesigned Edge and 2017 Escape.

Applications
 Approx. , 
 2015–2018 Ford Edge
 2015– Ford Everest
 2015– Zenos E10 S
 2016– Ford Tourneo
 2016– Ford Escape / Ford Kuga
 2017–2020 Ford Fusion
 2022- Ford Mondeo
 2021– Ford Bronco Sport
 2016–2020 Lincoln MKZ
 2022- Lincoln Zephyr
 2019-2020 Lincoln MKC
 , 
 2019– Ford Edge
 2019– Lincoln Nautilus
 2020– Lincoln Corsair
  at 5500 rpm,  at 3000 rpm
 2022– Ford Maverick

Motorsport 

2019– Ford Fiesta Rally2 (Detuned to 1600cc and developed by M-Sport)

2.3 L 
The 2.3L version of the EcoBoost engine debuted in the 2015 Ford Mustang and also the Lincoln MKC crossover and has been implemented in many Ford and Lincoln vehicles with various outputs.

The 2.3 L EcoBoost engine is produced with the 2.0 L EcoBoost at the Valencia Engine Plant in Valencia, Spain.  In March 2015 Ford announced the official production start of the all-new twin-scroll 2.0-liter and 2.3-liter EcoBoost engines for North America at its Cleveland Engine Plant in Ohio.

Applications
  at 5500 rpm,  at 3000 rpm
 2019– Ford Ranger
 2020– Ford Everest
  at 5600 rpm,  at 3000 rpm
 2016–2019 Ford Explorer
  at 5500 rpm,  at 2750 rpm
 2015–2019 Lincoln MKC
 2020–2022 Lincoln Corsair
  at 5500 rpm,  at 3500 rpm
 2020– Ford Explorer
 2021– Ford Bronco (300-hp, 325-lbft)
  at 5500 rpm,  at 3000 rpm
 2015– Ford Mustang EcoBoost
  at 6000 rpm,  at 3200 rpm
 2016–2018 Ford Focus RS
 2016- Zenos E10 R
 2017- Elemental RP1
  at 6000 rpm,  at 3200 rpm
 2016– VUHL 05 RR
  at 6200 rpm,  at 3000-3500 rpm
 2017- Dallara Stradale
  at 5500 rpm,  at 3000–4000 rpm
 2019– Ford Focus ST (2020)

V-type six-cylinder

2.7 L Nano (first generation) 
Introduced with the 2015 Ford F-150 is a twin-turbo 2.7 L V6 EcoBoost engine. The engine is built at the Lima Ford Engine Plant. Ford has invested US$500 million in the Lima plant for the new engine. Ford also states that the new engine will bring 300 jobs to Allen County, Ohio, but transfers from other plants make the actual number hard to pin down. A 335-hp version is to be an option on the 2017 Lincoln Continental. Being a next-generation design, it uses a two piece block design. Compacted graphite iron, a material Ford uses in its 6.7 L PowerStroke diesel engine, is used for the upper cylinder section with aluminum used for the lower stiffening section of the block.

Applications
  at 5750 rpm,  at 3000 rpm
 2015–2017 Ford F-150
  at 5500 rpm,  at 3000 rpm
 2016–2018 Lincoln MKX
 2017–2020 Lincoln Continental
  at 5500 rpm,  at 3250 rpm
 2019– Lincoln Nautilus
  at 4750 rpm,  at 2750 rpm
 2015–2018 Ford Edge Sport
  at 5000 rpm,  at 3000 rpm
 2019– Ford Edge ST
  at 5500 rpm,  at 3500 rpm
 2017–2019 Ford Fusion Sport

2.7 L Nano (second generation)
The second generation 2.7L EcoBoost V6 was introduced with the 2018 Ford F-150 and is mated to a 10-speed transmission that debuted the year prior.  It produces an additional  of torque over the first generation.  The engine uses a compacted-graphite iron (CGI) block, which is both high strength and lightweight.

It boasts a number of changes from the first generation, with many carrying over from the second generation 3.5L EcoBoost engine that arrived a year earlier in the F-150. The most prominent change being the addition of port fuel injection, while keeping the direct injection system. It also has reduced internal friction to improve power and fuel economy, and new exhaust gas recirculation system. The specific output of the engine is now 121 hp/L, versus the 395-hp Ford Coyote 5.0L naturally aspirated V-8 which has a specific output of only 78 hp/L. The peak torque matches the 5.0L V-8, albeit at a lower 2,750 rpm vs. 4,500 rpm for the V-8.

Additional changes include a new lightweight cam to save weight, dual-chain cam drive system that is stronger and reduces parasitic friction loss, a new electrically actuated wastegate that provides more accurate turbo boost control, a high-pressure exhaust gas recirculation system, and a variable-displacement belt-driven oil pump that is electronically controlled to modulate oil flow to further reduce parasitic losses.

Applications
  at 5000 rpm,  at 2750 rpm
 2018– Ford F-150
 2021– Ford Bronco

3.0 L Nano 
A 3.0L V6 twin-turbocharged gasoline direct-injection engine, derived from the 2.7 L EcoBoost, was released in 2016 that produces between 350 and 400 horsepower. The 3.0 L is gradually replacing the 3.7 L Ti-VCT Cyclone V6 engine in various vehicles, including the MKZ, Continental, Aviator, Ford Explorer and the 2022 Ford Bronco Raptor. 
The 3.0-liter version of the engine was created by increasing the 2.7-liter's cylinder bore in the CGI-block from 83.0 millimeters to 85.3, and by lengthening piston stroke by 3.0 millimeters (to 86.0).

Applications
  at 5500 rpm,  at 2750 rpm (Front-wheel drive only)
 2017– 2020 Lincoln MKZ
  at 5750 rpm,  at 2750 rpm (All-wheel drive only)
 2017– 2020 Lincoln Continental
 2017– 2020 Lincoln MKZ
  at 5500 rpm,  at 3500 rpm
 2020–2021 Ford Explorer
 at 5650 rpm,  at 3500 rpm
 2022– Ford Ranger Raptor
 at 5500 rpm,  at 3500 rpm
 2020– Ford Explorer ST (2022– King Ranch & Platinum trims)
 2020– Lincoln Aviator
 at 5650 rpm,  at 3500 rpm
2022– Ford Bronco Raptor
 total, with added electric engines at 5500 rpm, total, with added electric motors at 3000 rpm
 2020– Lincoln Aviator plug-in hybrid
  at 6250 rpm,  at 5900 rpm
 2022– Noble M500

3.5 L (first generation) 
The first Ford vehicle to feature this engine was the 2007 Lincoln MKR concept vehicle under the name TwinForce. The engine was designed to deliver power and torque output equivalent to a typical 6.0 L or larger-displacement V8 while achieving at least 15% better fuel efficiency and reduced greenhouse emissions. When the same prototype engine reappeared in the Lincoln MKT concept in 2008 North American International Auto Show, the name was changed to EcoBoost. Official EcoBoost production began on May 19, 2009 at Cleveland Engine Plant No. 1.

The production engines use the Duratec 35 V6 engine block. The fuel charging and delivery systems can attain high fuel pressures up to 2150 psi, necessary for efficient operation of the direct fuel injection system. The F-series EcoBoost 3.5L V6 uses two BorgWarner K03 turbochargers which can spin up to 170,000 rpm and provide up to 15 psi of boost. The transverse EcoBoost 3.5L V6 uses two Garrett GT1549L turbochargers and provides up to 11 psi of boost. The turbos are set up in a twin-turbo configuration. The engine can consume up to 25% more air over the naturally aspirated counterpart. Through the use of direct injection, the engine needs only regular-grade gasoline to run. The EcoBoost V6 was first available as an engine option for 2010 Lincoln MKS, followed by 2010 Ford Flex, 2010 Ford Taurus SHO, and 2010 Lincoln MKT.  The fuel-charging and -delivery systems were co-developed with Robert Bosch GmbH.

Applications
  at 5500 rpm,  at 2250 rpm
 2015– Ford Transit
  at 5700 rpm,  at 3500 rpm
 2010–2012 Ford Flex
 2010–2012 Lincoln MKS
 2010–2012 Lincoln MKT
  at 5500 rpm,  at 1500-5000 rpm
 2010–2019 Ford Taurus SHO
 2013–2019 Police Interceptor Sedan
 2013–2016 Lincoln MKS
 2013–2019 Lincoln MKT
  at 5500 rpm,  at 3500 rpm
 2013–2019 Ford Explorer Sport
 2016–2019 Ford Explorer Platinum
 2013–2019 Ford Flex
 2014–2019 Ford Police Interceptor Utility
  at 5000 rpm,  at 2500 rpm
 2011–2016 Ford F-150
  at 5000 rpm,  at 2250 rpm
 2015–2017 Ford Expedition/Expedition EL
  at 5250 rpm,  at 2750 rpm
 2015–2017 Lincoln Navigator/Navigator L

3.5 L (D35; second generation) 
The second generation 3.5L EcoBoost V6 (codename D35) was introduced for the 2017 Ford GT, revealed at the 2015 Detroit Auto Show in January, as well as the 2017 F-150, 2018 Expedition and 2018 Navigator. It produces up to   paired with a seven-speed semiautomatic transmission. This engine replaces the 5.4 L supercharged modular V8 from the last generation Ford GT. The GT was on an 11-year hiatus and returned in 2016 for the 2017 model year.

Also announced at the 2015 Detroit Auto Show was the 2017 Ford F-150 SVT Raptor, which is powered by an all-new 3.5 L twin-turbocharged EcoBoost V6. This new engine will produce 450 horsepower in the Raptor, up from the previous 6.2-L V8's 411.

The same second-generation 3.5L V6 is replacing the first-generation engine in the 2017 F-150 line-up.  It will be standard on the F-150 Limited and remain an optional upgrade for other trim levels. Paired with the second-generation 3.5L EcoBoost V6 is the new 10R80 10-speed automatic transmission that was co-designed with GM.  This new transmission will be outfitted on all second-generation 3.5L V6 EcoBoost F-150s.  The 10-speed will be exclusive to the 3.5L EcoBoost engine in F-150s for the 2017 model year.

Changes from previous generation
The most prominent change is the addition of port fuel injection, while keeping the direct injectors.  The port fuel injection was partly added due to the fuel output needs on the 3.5L HO Raptor engine, but also has several benefits for the 3.5L EcoBoost.  It will prevent buildup on the intake valves and keep them clean due to fuel passing over the valves.  Under certain engine conditions such as low rpm and low loads the high-pressure fuel pump and direct injection system will turn off and the engine will only use the port fuel injection, reducing efficiency losses due to the HPFP.  Both systems will operate at cold start, which will reduce emissions that direct injection suffers due to cold cylinder walls and lower fuel atomization.

The turbochargers continue to be supplied by Borg Warner.

The cam drive system changed from a single primary chain to a stronger two primary chain system with separate chains driving each cylinder bank.  In addition to dual primary chains, the side plates on the chains were also thickened. The cam chain drive sprocket on the crankshaft is a double gear arrangement to drive the two primary chains. These two changes were done to improve the harmonics, and are also stronger to help minimize the chain stretch that can occur over time on the 1st generation 3.5L EcoBoost.

The camshafts were made hollow for weight savings, along with the addition of a roller-finger follower valvetrain.  The compression ratio was increased from 10.0:1 to 10.5:1 (except on the 3.5L EcoBoost HO for the Raptor, which remains at 10.0:1).

The camshaft VCT (phaser) design was also changed to improve reliability and reduce the development of an engine start-up tapping/rattling noise over time. However, the VCT units are found to be failing around 40-80k miles, requiring a replacement to resolve.  
Ford has issued multiple service bulletins, with the most recent being Customer Satisfaction Program 21N03 – Supplement #4. This program extended warranty coverage under certain conditions for a VCT replacement due to tapping phasers.
The latest VCT part number (ML3Z prefix) is a significant redesign and so far has been durable and not shown the rattling/tapping issue develop.

Ford uses a single piston cooling jet per cylinder, but the oil volume was increased. The underside of the pistons were also redesigned to better transfer heat into the oil.

The engine also features auto start/stop, which decreases emissions during city driving by shutting the engine off in extended idling periods.

The engines are also  lighter than the previous 3.5L EcoBoost.

Applications
  at 5000 rpm,  at 2250-3500 rpm
 2017–2020 Ford F-150
 2018– Ford Expedition
 2020– Ford Police Interceptor Utility
  at 5000 rpm,  at 3250 rpm
 2018– Ford Expedition Platinum (2022- Limited w/ Stealth Performance Pkg)
 at 6000 rpm,  at 3100 rpm
2021– Ford F-150
 at 6000 rpm,  at 3000 rpm
2021– Ford F-150 PowerBoost Hybrid
  at 5000 rpm,  at 3500 rpm
 2017– Ford F-150 Raptor
 2019–2020 Ford F-150 Limited
 2018– Lincoln Navigator
  at 6250 rpm,  at 5900 rpm
 2017–2019 Ford GT
 at 6250 rpm,  at 5900 rpm
2020– Ford GT

Motorsports
 Ford GT LM GTE-Pro

See also
 Ford Duratec engine
 List of Ford engines
 Ford PowerShift transmission

References

EcoBoost
V6 engines
Straight-four engines
Straight-three engines
2009 introductions